KTXL (channel 40) is a television station in Sacramento, California, United States, affiliated with the Fox network. The station is owned by Nexstar Media Group, and maintains studios on Fruitridge Road near the Oak Park district on the southern side of Sacramento; its transmitter is located in Walnut Grove, California.

History

Early history of channel 40 in Sacramento (1953–1960)

The UHF channel 40 frequency in Sacramento was first occupied by KCCC-TV, which signed on in September 1953. It was affiliated with all four television networks of the time: ABC, CBS, NBC and the DuMont Television Network. KCCC's first broadcast was the 1953 World Series between the New York Yankees and the Brooklyn Dodgers. The station became a primary ABC affiliate by 1955, after KCRA-TV (channel 3) and KBET-TV (channel 10, now KXTV) signed on, respectively taking over NBC and CBS full-time; and dropped DuMont after that network folded in 1956. It was the Sacramento–Stockton–Modesto area's first television station. However, as a UHF station, it suffered in the ratings because television sets were not required to incorporate UHF tuning until the All-Channel Receiver Act went into effect in 1964. Although its fate was sealed when the first VHF stations signed on in the area, it managed to hang on until 1957. The ABC affiliation moved to KOVR (channel 13) after KCCC-TV and KOVR reached an agreement to merge operations and turn over the KCCC license to the Federal Communications Commission (FCC).

The former KCCC-TV studios and transmitting facilities were then sold to a group of broadcasters who applied for a new license, returning channel 40 to the air in late 1959 as KVUE, broadcasting from studios near the old California state fairgrounds off Stockton Boulevard. The station operated for just under five months before also falling silent. The KVUE call letters now reside on the ABC affiliate in Austin, Texas.

As an independent station (1963–1986)
In 1963, KVUE attempted to file for a license renewal even though the station had been off the air for more than three years; Camellia City Telecasters, a group headed by Jack Matranga, former owner and co-founder of radio station KGMS (now KTKZ), filed an application with the FCC to build a station on channel 40, as a challenge to the KVUE renewal, and was granted the license in early 1965. KTXL first signed on the air on October 26, 1968, operating as an independent station for nearly the first two decades of its existence. It was then branded as "TV 40". The station gained a huge advantage early on when its original owner won the local syndication rights to a massive number of movies, including classic and contemporary films. At one point, it had one of the largest film libraries in the Sacramento area. In addition, KTXL ventured into in-house productions, such as the children's program "Captain Mitch", horror movie host Bob Wilkins and Big Time Wrestling. The latter show aired until 1979, and was syndicated to several stations in California, Utah, Alaska and Hawaii. Channel 40 was one of the few stations to hold syndicated rights to the entire Merrie Melodies/Looney Tunes cartoon libraries (up until recently, different companies held different components of the cartoon output; all rights are now held by Warner Bros.).

In 1977, KTXL began a summer tradition by showcasing critically acclaimed classic feature films in annual "Summer Film Festival" presentations. Channel 40 made television history in 1981, by broadcasting the 1978 film The Deer Hunter (and later, many other movies) unedited with potentially objectionable material intact – this policy has been restricted somewhat in recent years. All of this made KTXL one of the leading independent stations in the western United States. It also attained regional superstation status via microwave relay to nearly every cable system in northern California, including the San Francisco Bay Area and Fresno, as well as several cable systems in Oregon, Nevada, Utah, Idaho and Montana.

KTXL began transmitting its signal from a  "Monster Tower" near Walnut Grove in October 1985, significantly increasing its signal strength and adding stereo capability.

Fox affiliation (1986–present)
On October 9, 1986, KTXL became a charter affiliate of the upstart Fox network, and eventually started branding as "Fox 40" on-air. The following year, Camellia City Telecasters sold KTXL to Renaissance Broadcasting. While most Fox affiliates since the mid-1990s have shifted away from running classic sitcoms and cartoons, to run syndicated talk shows on their daytime schedules; until recently, KTXL was among a few stations to be an exception to this status: the daytime lineup continued to feature sitcoms well into the 2000s, even still holding syndication rights to The Andy Griffith Show after many decades. Though many shows from the 1980s and 1990s were featured on the schedule, a few talk shows, reality series and court shows also populated the lineup.

In place of the station's own children's lineup after Captain Mitch's retirement, the station aired programming from Fox Kids until the network eliminated the weekday afternoon block in September 2002; the Saturday morning lineup (which by that time, became known as 4Kids TV) was retained as it began being programmed by 4Kids Entertainment that year until Fox dropped children's programming from its schedule in December 2008.

KTXL, along with NBC affiliate KCRA-TV, are the only Sacramento television stations to have never changed their network affiliations, as they were unaffected by affiliation swaps in 1995 (when KXTV acquired the ABC affiliation from KOVR, which in turn, switched to CBS) and 1998 (when KMAX-TV—channel 31—took UPN from KQCA—channel 58, which switched from UPN to The WB).

KTXL was acquired by Tribune Broadcasting following the company's purchase of Renaissance Broadcasting in 1996.

Sinclair and Fox purchase attempts; sale to Nexstar

Sinclair Broadcast Group announced their purchase of Tribune Media on May 8, 2017 for $3.9 billion and the assumption of $2.7 billion in Tribune-held debt. Sinclair—which previously owned KOVR until selling it to CBS Television Stations in 2005—opted to sell KTXL to Fox Television Stations as one of 23 stations to be divested in order to obtain regulatory approval. The resale to Fox was later amended to be part of a $910 million deal. Tribune Media terminated the merger on August 9, 2018 and filed a breach of contract lawsuit, nullifying both transactions outright; these actions came after FCC lead commissioner Ajit Pai publicly rejected the merger and the commission voted to have the deal subject to review.

Nexstar Media Group and Tribune Media agreed to an acquisition on December 3, 2018 for $6.4 billion in cash and debt. The merger closed on September 19, 2019.

Programming
In 2016, KTXL began producing a midday lifestyle program called Studio 40 Live. This program's format is similar to that of rival station KXTV's Sacramento and Company. This program also utilizes a modified, re-colored version of KTXL's logo from the late 1980s to early 1990s.

News operation
KTXL presently broadcasts 61½ hours of locally produced newscasts each week (with 11½ hours each weekday and two hours each on Saturdays and Sundays); in regards to the number of hours devoted to news programming, it is the second-highest local newscast output among Sacramento's broadcast television stations behind KOVR and KMAX-TV, which produce 79½ hours of local newscasts combined. Unlike the market's other stations, KTXL does not broadcast any local newscasts on weekend mornings.

In 1974, KTXL became the first station in the Sacramento market to carry a prime time newscast, titled The Ten O'Clock News. Originally airing only five days a week, before later expanding to a nightly newscast; the program's original anchor team consisted of news anchor Dave Preston, weather and news anchor Jan Jeffries, and sports anchor Ken Gimblin. After Preston left for unknown reasons, Jeffries was named primary anchor with weather anchors substituting. Other news and sports anchors continued the format until 1979, when the newscast was revived by Pete Wilson as NewsPlus (later known as The Ten O'Clock NewsPlus), in a format that went beyond regular newscasts (hence the "Plus" in the show's title). Such anchor teams as Andy Asher and Regina Cambell, and later Lauraine Woodward and Ted Mullins helmed the now hour-long newscast until KTXL joined Fox in 1986, and evolved into the current format of what is now Fox 40 News at 10. The newscast was notably promoted in the mid-1980s with a series of humorous advertisements featuring comedic actor Leslie Nielsen.

KTXL's main newscast competition at 10:00 p.m. includes a newscast on CBS-owned KOVR (which airs one hour earlier than the late newscasts on other "Big Three" stations) and a KCRA-produced news program on KQCA. Channel 40 ranks #1 in the ratings among the 18–49 adult demographic, and often comes in first or second in overall viewership at 10 p.m. In the summer of 2005, KTXL debuted a weekday morning newscast, which originally ran for two hours from 6 to 8 a.m., and primarily competes opposite KMAX's Good Day Sacramento and the first hour of KQCA's morning newscast. On September 8, 2008, the newscast was reformatted to Fox 40 Live and was expanded to 4½ hours from 4:30 to 9 a.m. The station hired well-known former Sacramento morning radio personality Paul Robins as anchor, and introduced a new news set adorned with flat-screens and an accompanying kitchen set.

On September 14, 2009, KTXL debuted both a midday newscast at 11:00 a.m. weekdays (which competes against KXTV's midday newscast in that time period) and an early evening newscast at 5:30 p.m. on weeknights to its schedule; this was later followed by the addition of a half-hour 6 p.m. newscast in September 2012. For over a decade, Fox (which has no network newscasts aside from Fox News Sunday) has motivated its affiliates and stations to increase local news programming; KTXL and Tribune's other Fox stations did not follow this request until September 2009, when most of the stations (except for KCPQ in Seattle, which would not add early evening newscasts for another year) expanded their newscasts into midday and early evening timeslots.

On January 7, 2010, beginning with its 10:00 p.m. newscast, KTXL became the fourth station in the Sacramento market to begin broadcasting its local newscasts in high definition. It was the first (and presently, the only) television station in the market to provide news video from the field in true high definition, as KTXL upgraded its ENG vehicles, satellite truck, studio and field cameras and other equipment in order to broadcast news footage from the field in high definition, in addition to segments broadcast from the main studio. This is in contrast to KCRA and KXTV, both of whom broadcast their field reports in widescreen standard definition (KOVR also shoots field reports in high definition but downconverts much of the footage to widescreen standard definition). On November 4, 2013, KTXL expanded its weekday evening news block to 90 minutes with the addition of a half-hour 5 p.m. newscast. Another expansion was made on September 18, 2017, with the addition of a half-hour 6:30 p.m. newscast. This newscast competes with a long-established newscast on KCRA and a KOVR-produced newscast on KMAX-TV. On December 4, 2019, KTXL debuted an hour-long 7 p.m. newscast on weekdays, becoming the first 7 p.m. newscast in the Sacramento media market. As a result, the station airs a continuous three-hour weekday evening news block from 5 to 8 p.m. In 2022, the station launched a half-hour 11 p.m. newscast for the first time in its history, competing with the long-established newscasts on KCRA and KXTV, as well as KOVR, but unlike its competitors, it only airs Monday through Saturday. A local public affairs program, Inside California Politics, instead airs Sunday nights at 11 p.m.

Notable former on-air staff
 Mike Bond – reporter (1989–2005; now a public information officer with the California Lottery)
 Thomas Drayton – anchor (2002–2008; now at WTXF in Philadelphia)
 Michelle Franzen – reporter/fill-in anchor (1995–1998; now with ABC News Radio in New York)
 Adam Housley – reporter (1999–2001; now a Los Angeles bureau reporter at Fox News)
 Gary Radnich – sports anchor (now retired from KRON-TV and KNBR radio in San Francisco)
 Pete Wilson – NewsPlus creator/co-anchor (1979–1983; later at KGO-TV and KRON-TV in San Francisco; died of a heart attack on July 20, 2007, at the age of 62)
 Monica Woods – chief meteorologist (1995–1999; now at KXTV)

Controversies

Nodar Kumaritashvili crash video
On February 12, 2010, KTXL was one of the first media outlets to obtain a video copy of a luge accident that occurred during the 2010 Winter Olympics in Vancouver, which resulted in the death of Georgian luger Nodar Kumaritashvili. KTXL made the editorial decision to post the video on its website, ahead of several major national and international outlets. The video clip raised some debate among journalism critics and editorial boards at several news organizations as to whether the footage should have been broadcast or posted online at all (the footage was briefly available on YouTube, but was removed several times due to copyright takedown notices filed by the International Olympic Committee).

In an interview with the Seattle Post-Intelligencer, a KTXL staff member cited fair use as the decision to post the clip on the website after questions arose about the safety of the luge track. The station also ran the complete footage (though with occasional pauses and a viewer discretion advisory) during its 5:30 p.m. newscast that evening. The video was later distributed by KTXL to several other Tribune-owned websites.

Miss Universe 2015
During KTXL's broadcast of the Miss Universe 2015 pageant on Fox (in which host Steve Harvey accidentally announced the wrong winner of the pageant), the station's broadcast automation system was not put on pause, cutting off the penultimate minutes of the pageant inadvertently to start the station's 10 p.m. newscast on time (the broadcast ended two minutes longer than scheduled due to Harvey's mistake, a schedule discrepancy which remained despite Fox's western feed airing the event on a three-hour tape delay). This meant viewers in the Sacramento market were unable to see the apology and crowning of the winner. In addition, the newscast that followed did not mention the event.

Technical information

Subchannels
The station's digital signal is multiplexed:

On January 1, 2011, KTXL became a charter affiliate of the Antenna TV network upon its launch; it is carried on digital subchannel 40.2.

Analog-to-digital conversion
In November 1999, KTXL installed the first full-powered digital television transmitter in the Sacramento market operating on UHF channel 55. KTXL shut down its analog signal, over UHF channel 40, on June 12, 2009, as part of the federally mandated transition from analog to digital television. The station's digital signal relocated from its pre-transition UHF channel 55, which was among the high band UHF channels (52-69) that were removed from broadcasting use as a result of the transition, to its analog-era UHF channel 40 for post-transition operations.

References

External links
 Official website

Fox network affiliates
Antenna TV affiliates
Grit (TV network) affiliates
TBD (TV network) affiliates
Television channels and stations established in 1968
TXL
Nexstar Media Group
1968 establishments in California